The Shadow Cabinet of Christopher Luxon has formed the official Opposition in the 53rd New Zealand Parliament since December 2021, replacing the Shadow Cabinet of Judith Collins. Christopher Luxon was appointed Leader of the National Party and Leader of the Opposition in a party leadership election on 30 November 2021.

Origins
On 24 November 2021, National Party leader Judith Collins demoted National MP and former leader Simon Bridges over historical allegations of "serious misconduct" involving fellow MP Jacqui Dean. In reality, the "serious misconduct" was just a joke Bridges had made to Dean several years earlier, causing mild offense to her, for which he had already given an accepted apology. In response to Collins' demotion of Bridges, the National Party's parliamentary caucus passed a vote of no confidence in her leadership on 25 November. Deputy leader Shane Reti assumed the role of interim leader until a leadership vote was held on 30 November.

Bridges and Christopher Luxon announced they were running for the leadership while Nicola Willis announced she was running for the deputy leadership. Prior to the leadership vote on 30 November, Bridges withdrew from the race and endorsed Luxon. As a result, Luxon and Willis were elected as leader and deputy leader.

Formation
In his first post-leadership election press conference on 30 November 2021, Luxon did not release many details on portfolio allocations that would be given out in the first iteration of his shadow cabinet, but it was confirmed that Wellington Central-based List MP Nicola Willis would be Deputy Leader of the Opposition and that she would most likely retain the Housing spokesperson portfolio.

The following day the Otago Daily Times reported that Michael Woodhouse, who shared the Finance portfolio with Andrew Bayly, was likely to not retain the role in Luxon's shadow cabinet. Luxon announced on 2 December 2021 that Bridges would be the finance and infrastructure spokesperson, ranked third in the shadow cabinet. Luxon announced the remaining portfolio allocations on 6 December. Only the first 20 were given numerical rankings, with the rest being listed by seniority. On 7 December, the caucus elected Chris Penk as senior whip and re-elected Maureen Pugh as junior whip.

Subsequent changes
Luxon carried out his first shadow cabinet reshuffle on 16 March 2022 to account for the resignation of Finance and Infrastructure spokesperson Simon Bridges, who was ranked third in the line up. Bridge's Finance portfolio was given to Deputy Leader Nicola Willis while Infrastructure was given to Chris Bishop, who also moved up in the rankings from fourth to third, while replacing Willis in the Housing portfolio. Dr Shane Reti moved up from fifth to fourth in the rankings, with Justice spokesperson Paul Goldsmith moving up from 12th to replace Reti in fifth.

On 14 October 2022 Barbara Kuriger, Spokesperson for Agriculture, Biosecurity and Food Safety, resigned from her portfolios due to a personal conflict of interest between her and the Ministry for Primary Industries. Todd Muller picked up the roles in an acting capacity pending a larger reshuffle.

National MP Sam Uffindell entered Parliament as Simon Bridges' successor through the 2022 Tauranga by-election in June 2022, although was suspended from caucus the following month before being allocated any portfolio. Following an investigation into historical bullying allegations, Uffindell was reinstated into the National caucus and, in November 2022, he  confirmed in an Instagram Q and A he was the party's new Associate Spokesperson for Research, Science, and Innovation, and Associate Spokesperson for Economic and Regional Development.

Luxon announced an election year reshuffle on 19 January 2023. Former leaders Judith Collins and Todd Muller were reported as the "big winners" with Collins returning to 10th position and Muller returned to the climate change and agriculture portfolios he had held between 2018 and 2020. New MP Tama Potaka became spokesperson for Māori Development. Senior MP Chris Bishop gained responsibility for reform of the Resource Management Act 1991, losing the COVID-19 portfolio to Health spokesperson Shane Reti. Barbara Kuriger was retained as Conservation spokesperson and Todd McClay was returned to the group of twenty ranked MPs.

List of spokespersons
The list of portfolio spokespersons, is as follows.

Policies

Childcare
In early March 2023, Luxon announced National's childcare tax rebate policy known as "Family Boost" during his "State of the Nation" speech in Auckland. As part of the Family Boost policy, National if elected at the 2023 New Zealand general election would order the public service to slash consultancy bills by NZ$400 million. National would reallocate these funds to giving a 25% rebate to most families' childcare bills. Under National's proposed childcare policy, families earning below NZ$140,000 per annum would get a weekly rebate of NZ$75, totalling to an annual rebate of NZ$3,900. Families earning between NZ$140,000 and NZ$180,000 would be eligible for a progressively smaller rebate while those earning above NZ$180,000 would not qualify for the rebate. National's public service spokesperson Simeon Brown announced that a future National Government would also reduce the amount of public funds spent on hiring consultants and contractors. In response, Deputy Prime Minister Carmel Sepuloni claimed that National's childcare rebate policy was not well designed and would not help the bottom income earners.

Conversion therapy
In early February 2022, Luxon announced that National MPs would be allowed a conscience vote on the Labour Government's Conversion Practices Prohibition Legislation Bill; abandoning Collins' opposition to the legislation. The Conversion Practices Prohibition Bill passed its third and final reading on 15 February 2022; with 25 National MPs including Luxon voting in favour of the legislation and eight voting against it.

Justice

Organised crime
In mid–June 2022, Luxon announced that the National Party if elected into government would introduce several anti-gang legislation banning gang insignia in public spaces and social media platforms such as Instagram and TikTok, and giving the Police special powers to disperse gang gatherings, and preventing certain gang members from associating with each other or obtaining firearms. The National Party had unveiled its anti-gang policies at its Northern Regional Conference in response to heightened gang activity and conflict that year.

In response, Waikato Mongrel Mob leader Sonny Fatupaito claimed that National's proposed policies would discriminate against Māori and Pasifika while criminologist Dr. Jarrod Gilbert suggested focusing on the gang's criminal activities. Despite supporting National's anti-gang policies, the ACT Party's firearms law reform and justice spokeswoman Nicole McKee expressed concern that legitimate firearms owners could be affected by some of the legislation. Former National Party MP, cabinet minister, and police officer Chester Borrows questioned the effectiveness of his party's proposed anti-gang policies, citing the failure of previous anti-gang insignia legislation in Whanganui.

Youth crime
In mid November 2022, Luxon announced that the National Party's youth crime policy would include:
Creating a new Young Serious Offender category for juveniles aged between 10 and 17 years who had committed at least two serious offenses. The category can last for two years and would carry consequences including electronic monitoring, community service, or being sent to Young Offender Military Academies.
Establishing Youth Offender Military Academies. These boot camps would be run by the Ministry of Justice and New Zealand Defence Force for young offenders aged between 15 and 17 years. The academies would provide education, counselling, drug and alcohol treatment, cultural support, and assigning mentors to the offenders' families. 
Banning gang patches, insignia and gatherings in public places and giving Police additional search powers for firearms.
Funding iwi and rehabilitative community groups to support young offenders who have attended youth offender military academies.
Luxon stated that the policy was in response to a recent surge in ram raids in 2022. He estimated that the youth justice police would cost NZ$25 million a year and would constitute part of National's social investment. 

National also confirmed that it would support placing ankle bracelets on young offenders below the age of 17 years. In addition, Justice spokesperson Paul Goldsmith confirmed the Party would support a law change to fit young offenders below the age of 12 years with ankle bracelets. National had earlier opposed the ACT Party's policy of fitting juvenile offenders with ankle bracelets; with education spokesperson Erica Stanford describing it as "heartbreaking."

In response, Prime Minister Jacinda Ardern described National's proposed boot camp policy as a failure while Green Party co-leader Marama Davidson described it as "absolutely disgusting." The NZ Psychological Society described "forced" military boot camps as "draconian, oppressive, and ineffective." Auckland youth development worker and advocate Aaron Hendry stated that boot camps failed to address recidivism and the causes of youth crime while Just Speak executive director Aphiphany Forward-Taua described the policy as lazy "politicking." By contrast, former Hamilton City councillor Mark Bunting opined that boot camps could help deal with high youth crime in the Waikato region and was a better alternative to sending youth offenders to prison.

In early December 2022, a 1 News Kantar public opinion poll found that 60% of respondents supported National's military boot camp policy while 31% opposed it and 9% were undecided. The poll surveyed 1,011 eligible voters including mobile phone users and online panels. Those most likely to support the boot camp policy were National and ACT voters, women aged 55 years and above, and Aucklanders. Those most opposed to the policy were Green voters, Wellingtonians, Labour voters, and those aged between 18 and 29 years.

Social development
On 7 July 2022, Luxon outlined the National Party's policies to combat youth unemployment during the party's annual conference in Christchurch. One key policy is redirecting funding from the Ministry of Social Development to supporting job coaches for young people under the age of 25 years who have been on the Jobseeker benefit for three months. Welfare beneficiaries who find a job and stay off the benefit for the next 12 consecutive months will receive NZ$1,000 for staying in the workforce.  However, beneficiaries who do not follow their agreed plan will face "sanctions." Luxon claimed that the incumbent Labour Government's policies had caused the number of under 25s on welfare to increase by 34,000 (roughly 40%).

Voting age
Following the Supreme Court of New Zealand's landmark Make It 16 Incorporated v Attorney-General, the party's Justice spokesperson Paul Goldsmith stated that National would not be supporting lowering the voting age on the grounds that it regarded the current voting age of 18 years as appropriate. Goldsmith described the Labour Government's support for introducing legislation lowering the voting age as a distraction from youth crime.

References

Luxon, Christopher
Luxon, Christopher
2021 establishments in New Zealand